Johan Vonlanthen Benavídez (born 1 February 1986) is a Swiss former professional footballer who played as a winger.

Having made his Swiss Super League debut BSC Young Boys at the age of 16, he moved to PSV in 2003.

He initially announced the end of his active career in May 2012. He came back out of retirement in May 2013 and signed for Grasshoppers in June. He retired in August 2018 after two years with FC Wil.

Club career

Early career
Vonlanthen played as a junior for BSC Young Boys in Switzerland. In the 2001–02 season, he made his debut as a 16-year-old in the Swiss Super League starting eight games and appearing once as a substitute. In the summer of 2003, he was transferred to the Dutch Eredivisie club PSV Eindhoven. On 21 June 2004, Vonlanthen became the youngest goalscorer when he scored for the Switzerland national team against France in Coimbra, Portugal at the age of 18 years and 141 days old. He made a good initial impression and helped PSV qualify for the UEFA Champions League. After a good first season, he began to lose form and as a consequence was loaned out to Italian side Brescia Calcio for the last six months of the 2004–05 season. He was again loaned out to NAC Breda for the 2005–06 season.

Red Bull Salzburg

At the start of the 2006–07 season, Vonlanthen transferred to Red Bull Salzburg in the Austrian Bundesliga.

On 13 July 2009, FC Zürich signed the Swiss forward on a season long loan deal. The move was not made permanent, and Vonlanthen returned to Salzburg for the start of the 2010–11 season.

Itagüí, Wohlen and initial retirement
Vonlanthen moved to Colombian Primera División side Itagüí in August 2011.

On 30 May 2012, Vonlanthen announced his retirement at age 26. According to him, he 'could not face the prospect of undergoing a knee operation'.

Return
On 13 June 2013, Vonlanthen came out of retirement to join Grasshoppers, signing a one-year deal with an option for a further two years.

On 27 December 2013, Vonlanthen was loaned out to Swiss second division side Schaffhausen, due to a lack of playtime at Grasshoppers.

He retired in August 2018 after two years with FC Wil.

International career
Vonlanthen's stepfather is a Swiss national, giving him the right to play for that country.

On 6 June 2004, Vonlanthen made his senior debut for the Switzerland national team against Liechtenstein. He came on as a substitute in the 81st minute to replace Alexander Frei. Switzerland went on to beat Liechtenstein 1–0.

At Euro 2004, Vonlanthen became the second youngest player to play in the tournament when he came on as a substitute against England. On 21 June 2004, Vonlanthen became the youngest scorer ever in the European Championships when he equalised against France, beating Wayne Rooney's record – which had only been set four days before – by three months.

Since the European Championships in Portugal, Vonlanthen has managed to hold a regular position in the national team and as well as playing frequently in the under 21s side. He was part of the squad that very narrowly lost out to Spain on a place in the 2009 European Championships. He had scored the equaliser in the first leg in a 2–1 win but the Spanish came back to win 3–1 in the second leg and 4–3 on aggregate.

Vonlanthen was called up to the Swiss squad to play in 2006 World Cup, but was unable to participate due to a hamstring injury. He was also called up for Euro 2008.

Career statistics

Club

International

References

External links

 www.psvweb.nl profile 

1986 births
Living people
People from Santa Marta
Association football wingers
Swiss people of Colombian descent
Colombian footballers
Swiss men's footballers
Swiss expatriate sportspeople in Italy
Switzerland international footballers
Switzerland youth international footballers
Switzerland under-21 international footballers
BSC Young Boys players
PSV Eindhoven players
Brescia Calcio players
NAC Breda players
FC Red Bull Salzburg players
FC Zürich players
Águilas Doradas Rionegro players
FC Wohlen players
Grasshopper Club Zürich players
FC Schaffhausen players
Servette FC players
FC Wil players
Swiss expatriate footballers
Expatriate footballers in the Netherlands
Expatriate footballers in Austria
Expatriate footballers in Italy
UEFA Euro 2004 players
UEFA Euro 2008 players
Austrian Football Bundesliga players
Swiss Super League players
Swiss Challenge League players
Eredivisie players
Serie A players
Categoría Primera A players
Sportspeople from Magdalena Department